The Battle of Camotes Islands in the Pacific campaign of World War II was the amphibious invasion of the Poro Island in the Philippines by United States forces, who fought against the Imperial Japanese Army in the Philippines from 17 October - 26 December 1944. The operation was a small part of the Philippines campaign of 1944–45 for the recapture and liberation of the entire Philippine Archipelago and to end almost three years of Japanese occupation.

History
As the stories about Japanese torturing and killing about 300 local inhabitants on 29 December 1944 in Pilar of Ponson Island have reached Leyte, the General John R. Hodge has ordered a battalion landing team from 7th Infantry Division to capture Ponson Island on 15 January 1945. The naval protection was provided by 4 PT boats under command of Lieutenant Commander Leeson on PT-134. The team found the Ponson Island evacuated by Japanese, after landed unopposed on north and south tips of the island.

On 18 January 1945, the landing force has left the Ponson Island and established a beachhead on Poro Island. On 19 January fire contacts with the Japanese garrison were reported. On 23 January 1945, a Japanese positions on "Hill 854" were encountered. The Japanese resistance was eliminated on 31 January 1945, and US fores has returned to Leyte on 2 February 1945. The control of Poro Island was given away to 2nd battalion of the 94th infantry regiment of the Commonwealth of the Philippines forces.

References

 This article incorporates material from the Wikipedia page Camotes_Islands, accessed 8 March 2016

Conflicts in 1944
1944 in the Philippines
South West Pacific theatre of World War II
Battles and operations of World War II involving the Philippines
History of Cebu
Battles of World War II involving Japan